Bruce Rodney Wingate Parker,  (born 20 July 1941) is a British journalist and television presenter whose career spanned the mid-1960s to 2003, when he retired.

Career
Strongly committed to regional broadcasting, he was responsible in the mid-1960s for a pilot local radio station in the Channel Islands, which eventually led to the setting up of a string of BBC local radio stations across the UK. In 1967 he joined BBC South in Southampton, where he remained for most of his career, making a name as the main presenter and reporter for South Today for 37 years, a record stint for any regional presenter in the UK. He was also a respected political interviewer and later BBC South's political editor, hosting South of Westminster and South on Sunday.

In the 1970s he became a familiar face to viewers in the rest of Britain, first as a network news reporter and later as the first host of Antiques Roadshow (which he helped set up with Robin Drake) and a regular contributor to and presenter of Nationwide. He also presented the BBC1 arts magazine Mainstream in 1979 and a number of Songs of Praise editions in the 1970s and 1980s. He was also the BBC commentator for the raising of the Mary Rose in October 1982, clips of which regularly appear on nostalgia and retrospective programmes. He also presented a number of programmes on Radio 4 including The Week's Antiques, which he devised, and the regional Today from the South and West.

He has won several Royal Television Society awards and is the author of Everybody's Soapbox (with Nigel Farrell), The History of Elizabeth College and A History of Guernsey Full-Bore Rifle Shooting.

Brought up in Guernsey, Parker was educated at Elizabeth College Guernsey followed by the University of Wales and a postgraduate degree at the University of Reading. He is chairman of the friends of Winchester Cathedral and a cathedral trustee. He also chaired two educational charities in Guernsey, the Elizabeth College Foundation and the Gibson Fleming Trust and is the former chairman of Harestock School governors in Winchester, a resident of Appleshaw in Hampshire and was chairman of Appleshaw Parish Council for six years until January 2016.

Created Honorary Fellow of Winchester University, 2018. Made Companion of the Order of St Swithun by Winchester Cathedral Chapter, 2023.

References

External links
Retirement and special award from BBC

1941 births
Living people
British male journalists
Members of the Order of the British Empire
Place of birth missing (living people)
Guernsey people
People from Appleshaw